This page details the all-time statistics, records, and other achievements pertaining to the Crvena zvezda. Crvena zvezda is a Serbian men's professional basketball team currently playing in the ABA League, the EuroLeague and in the Basketball League of Serbia.

Overview 
Note: Statistics are correct through the end of the 2017–18 season.

Honours

Total titles: 43

Source: Crvena zvezda

Other tournaments
 Magenta SportCup
Winner (1): 2021

Individual awards and accomplishments

Naismith Memorial Basketball Hall of Fame

FIBA Hall of Fame

FIBA Order of Merit recipients

FIBA's 50 Greatest Players

50 Greatest EuroLeague Contributors 

Other player nominees: Zoran Slavnić
Other coaching nominees: Ranko Žeravica, Svetislav Pešić

European Competitions 

All-EuroLeague First Team
 Boban Marjanović – 2015

All-EuroLeague Second Team
 Quincy Miller – 2016

EuroLeague MVP of the Month
 Ognjen Kuzmić – January 2017
 Luca Vildoza – December 2022

EuroLeague MVP of the Round
 DeMarcus Nelson – 2013–14
 Boban Marjanović – 2013–14, 2014–15 (3×)
 Maik Zirbes – 2015–16
 James Feldeine – 2017–18
 Jordan Loyd – 2020–21
 Filip Petrušev – 2022–23

FIBA European Cup Winners' Cup Finals Top Scorer
 Dragan Kapičić – 1974
 Zoran Slavnić – 1975

ULEB Cup regular season MVP
 Milan Gurović – 2007

ULEB Cup MVP of the Round
 Milan Gurović – 2007 (3×)
 Mike Taylor – 2010

ULEB Cup Top Scorer
 Milan Gurović – 2007

All-EuroCup First Team
 DeMarcus Nelson – 2014

Adriatic Competitions 

ABA League MVP
 Milan Gurović – 2007
 Tadija Dragićević – 2008
 Nikola Kalinić – 2022

ABA League Finals MVP
 Raško Katić – 2013
 Boban Marjanović – 2015
 Stefan Jović – 2016
 Charles Jenkins – 2017
 Billy Baron – 2019
 Landry Nnoko – 2021
 Ognjen Dobrić – 2022

ABA League Top Scorer
 Igor Rakočević – 2004
 Milan Gurović – 2007
 Tadija Dragićević – 2008

Best Defender
 Branko Lazić – 2021, 2022

Coach of the Season
 Dejan Radonjić – 2014, 2015

ABA League Player of the Month Award
 Boban Marjanović – November 2014
 Maik Zirbes – February 2016
 Milko Bjelica – November 2017
 Luca Vildoza – October 2022

ABA League Ideal Starting Five
 DeMarcus Nelson – 2014
 Boban Marjanović – 2014, 2015
 Maik Zirbes – 2016
 Stefan Jović – 2017
 Charles Jenkins – 2017
 Marko Simonović – 2017
 Taylor Rochestie – 2018
 Joe Ragland – 2019
 Stratos Perperoglou – 2019
 Jordan Loyd – 2021
 Nikola Kalinić – 2022

ABA Super Cup MVP
 Mouhammad Faye – 2018

National Competitions 

 Yugoslavia
Yugoslav League Top Scorer
 Milan Bjegojević – 1953
 Borislav Ćurčić – 1955
 Branko Radović – 1959
 Vladimir Cvetković – 1966, 1967
 Boban Janković – 1992

 Serbia and Montenegro
YUBA League MVP
 Nebojša Ilić – 1993
 Mileta Lisica – 1994

YUBA League Most Improved Player
 Igor Rakočević – 1998

YUBA League Young MVP
 Predrag Stojaković – 1993

 Serbia
BLS Super League MVP
 Boban Marjanović – 2014, 2015

BLS Finals MVP
 Milan Gurović – 2007
 Omar Thomas – 2012
 Maik Zirbes – 2016
 Ognjen Dobrić – 2017, 2021
 Alen Omić – 2018
 Nikola Ivanović – 2022

National Cup
Radivoj Korać Cup MVP
 Goran Jeretin – 2004, 2006
 DeMarcus Nelson – 2013
 Luka Mitrović – 2015
 Marko Gudurić – 2017
 Marko Jagodić-Kuridža – 2021
 Nate Wolters – 2022

Radivoj Korać Cup Top Scorer
 Mile Ilić – 2012
 Michael Scott – 2013
 Raško Katić – 2014
 Luka Mitrović – 2015
 Marko Simonović – 2017

Medals with National teams 
List of the Crvena zvezda players who won a medal with their respective national team at the Summer Olympics, the FIBA Basketball World Cup and the FIBA EuroBasket.

Summer Olympics
   Marko Simonović (2016 Rio de Janeiro)
   Stefan Jović (2016 Rio de Janeiro)
   Vladimir Štimac (2016 Rio de Janeiro)
   Vladimir Cvetković (1968 Mexico City)
   Zoran Slavnić (1976 Montreal)
   Rajko Žižić (1984 Los Angeles)
   Duop Reath (2020 Tokyo)

World Cup
   Milenko Topić (1998 Greece)
   Zoran Jovanović (1990 Argentina)
   Dragan Kapičić (1970 Yugoslavia)
   Ljubodrag Simonović (1970 Yugoslavia)
   Raško Katić (2014 Spain)
   Marko Simonović (2014 Spain)
   Nikola Kalinić (2014 Spain)
   Vladimir Cvetković (1963 Brazil)
   Vladimir Cvetković (1967 Uruguay)
   Zoran Slavnić (1974 Puerto Rico)
   Dragan Kapičić (1974 Puerto Rico)
   Zoran Radović (1986 Spain)
   Rajko Žižić (1982 Colombia)
   Zufer Avdija (1982 Colombia)
   Zoran Radović (1982 Colombia)

EuroBasket
   Milenko Topić (1997 Spain)
   Zoran Sretenović (1995 Greece)
   Dejan Tomašević (1995 Greece)
   Zoran Jovanović (1991 Italy)
   Zoran Radović (1989 Yugoslavia)
   Zoran Slavnić (1977 Belgium)
   Dragan Kapičić (1975 Yugoslavia)
   Zoran Slavnić (1975 Yugoslavia)
   Zoran Slavnić (1973 Spain)
   Marko Gudurić (2017 Turkey)
   Stefan Jović (2017 Turkey)
   Branko Lazić (2017 Turkey)
   Ognjen Kuzmić (2017 Turkey)
   Nemanja Bjelica (2009 Poland)
   Dragan Kapičić (1971 West Germany)
   Dragiša Vučinić (1971 West Germany)
   Ljubodrag Simonović (1971 West Germany)
   Vladimir Cvetković (1969 Italy)
   Ljubodrag Simonović (1969 Italy)
   Dragan Kapičić (1969 Italy)
   Dragan Lukovski (1999 France)
   Saša Obradović (1999 France)
   Milenko Topić (1999 France)
   Zoran Radović (1987 Greece)

Competitions

National Leagues

First Federal Basketball League 
Positions by year

YUBA League 
Positions by year

Basketball League of Serbia 
Positions by year

Adriatic League 

The ABA League, commonly known as the Adriatic League, is a regional men's professional basketball league competition between men's teams from six countries: Bosnia and Herzegovina, Croatia, Macedonia, Montenegro, Serbia and Slovenia. Crvena zvezda made the league debut in 2002, in the second season.

National Cups

Yugoslav Cup
Positions by year (SFR Yugoslavia)

Positions by year (FR Yugoslavia)

Radivoj Korać Cup 
Positions by year

European Competitions

Top performances in Europe

The road to the European Victory

1973–74 FIBA European Cup Winners' Cup
{| class="wikitable" style="text-align: left; font-size:95%"
|- bgcolor="#ccccff"
! Round
! Team
!   Home  
!   Away  
|-
|1st round
| 17 Nëntori Tirana
|align="center"|114–70
|align="center"|99–83
|-
|2nd round
| Alsace Bagnolet
|align="center"|102–86
|align="center"|92–94
|-
|rowspan=2|Quarter-finals
| CSKA Sofia
|align="center"|80–72
|align="center"|81–88
|-
| Saclà Asti
|align="center"|93–86
|align="center"|88–87
|-
|Semi-finals
| Estudiantes Monteverde
|align="center"|104–85
|align="center"|79–74
|-
|Final
| Spartak ZJŠ Brno
|colspan=2 align="center"|86–75
|}

 Club records 

Most games played

List of players who have played at least 300 games.

Most games coached

List of coaches who have coached more than 100 games.

 Most points scored 
List of players who have scored more than 3,000 points for Crvena zvezda in all competitions.

List of players who have scored more than 760 points for Crvena zvezda in all European competitions.
  Dragan Kapičić (989)
  Predrag Bogosavljev (901)
  Slobodan Nikolić (879)
  Igor Rakočević (878)
  Zoran Slavnić (768)
  Charles Jenkins (763)

List of players who have scored more than 1,000 points for Crvena zvezda in the ABA League. (as of June 2022)
  Branko Lazić (1,335)
  Ognjen Dobrić (1,263)
  Tadija Dragićević (1,234)
  Marko Simonović (1,135)
  Charles Jenkins (1,093)

 Most points scored in a game 

 In a game 
 Largest margin of victory in a game – 114 (Score: 118–4) a 1946 Belgrade Championship game with Kosmaj Mladenovac, 1 June 1946
 Largest margin of defeat in a game – 54 (Score: 140–86) a 1963 season road game with Olimpija
 Most points scored – 150 (Score: 116–150); a 1990–91 season road game with Napredak Aleksinac
 Least points scored – 13 (Score: 13–21); a 1949 season home game with Partizan

 In a season 
Team
 Most games won in a national championship – 28; 1992–93 season
 Most games won in all competitions – 67; 2016–17
 Least games lost in a national championship – 0; 1947
 Most games played in all competitions – 84; 2016–17
Player
 Most games played in all competitions – 83; Charles Jenkins, 2016–17
 Most points scored in all competitions – 1,355; Milan Gurović, 2006–07
 Most points scored in a European competition – 502; Jordan Loyd, 2020–21
 Most points per game in a national championship – 34.3; Vladimir Cvetković, 1966

 In a career 
 Most seasons played – 14; Slobodan Nikolić
 Most trophies won in total – 20; Branko Lazić
 Most national championships won – 9; Srđan Kalember, Milan Bjegojević
 Most national cups won – 6; Branko Lazić
 Most Adriatic championships won''' – 6; Branko Lazić

NBA

Players on the NBA draft

Moved to an NBA team

See also 
 KK Partizan accomplishments and records

References

External links
 KK Crvena zvezda official website 

 
C